Ataxia alpha is a species of beetle in the family Cerambycidae. It was described by Chemsak and Noguera in 1993. It is known from Mexico.

References

Ataxia (beetle)
Beetles described in 1993